Brickendon and Woolmers Estates is an Australian National Heritage and World Heritage area, as part of the Australian Convict Sites World Heritage Area. It consists of adjacent farming properties:

 Woolmers Estate 
 Brickendon Estate